Dictyoptera is a genus of net-winged beetles in the family Lycidae. There are at least four described species in Dictyoptera.

Species
 Dictyoptera aurora (Herbst, 1784) (golden net-wing)
 Dictyoptera hamatus Mannerheim, 1843
 Dictyoptera mundus (Say, 1835)
 Dictyoptera simplicipes Mannerheim, 1843

References

Further reading

 
 
 
 
 

Lycidae